

Tally Man

Teen Lantern

TNT

Mister Toad

Mister Toad is a fictional character appearing in American comic books published by DC Comics.

Mister Toad in other media
Mister Toad appears in Beware the Batman, voiced by Udo Kier. This version is an eco-terrorist and associate of Professor Pyg with a sonic croak attack.

Tokamak

Tokamak is a supervillain in the DC Universe.

The character, created by Gerry Conway and Pat Broderick, first appeared in The Fury of Firestorm #15 (August 1983) as Henry Hewitt and became Tokamak in The Fury of Firestorm #18 (November 1983).

Within the context of the stories, Tokamak is the identity taken by Henry Hewitt, the chief executive officer of the Hewitt Corporation and high level director in the 2000 Committee, after subjecting himself to a recreation of the accident that created Firestorm. Much later, to cure a terminal disease, he creates a clone of himself which he merges with. He creates the identity of Victor Hewitt to inherit his own company and sets out to create nuclear meltdowns across the globe to empower himself. He is stopped by Firestorm, Firehawk and Pozhar. He is killed when Firestorm separates him from his clone.

Tokamak has the ability to trap objects in energy rings and either compress them or break down their structural integrity.

Tokamak in other media
 Henry Hewitt appears in The Flash episode "The Fury of Firestorm", portrayed by Demore Barnes. This version is a scientist with anger issues and a criminal past who was affected by Eobard Thawne's particle accelerator. The Flash and his allies at S.T.A.R. Labs select Hewitt to become Martin Stein's new partner and become part of Firestorm. While the fusion fails, Hewitt gains uncontrollable nuclear powers and uses them to fight the Flash, only to be defeated by Stein and Jefferson "Jax" Jackson, both of whom successfully became Firestorm. Following this, Hewitt is imprisoned in S.T.A.R. Labs' metahuman holding cells.
 Additionally, an Earth-2 doppelganger of Hewitt appears in the episodes "Welcome to Earth-2" and "Escape from Earth-2" as a kindly scientist who works at S.T.A.R. Labs with Harry Wells.

Joey Toledo
Joey Toledo was a drug dealer working for the 100. When he and his gang members invaded the gymnasium of Garfield High School and attacked Jefferson Pierce, Earl Clifford came to his defense and helped to fight them off. Tobias Whale heard of what happened and ordered Toledo to make an example out of Earl. Joey Toledo led his men into attacking Earl where the altercation led to Earl getting struck by a car. Joey then had his goons suspend his dead body from the basketball net in the gymnasium. With help from Peter Gambi, Jefferson Pierce becomes Black Lightning where he beats up Joey Toledo's men. Afterwards, Black Lightning grabbed Joey and pressured him to tell him everything there was to know about the 100. He told him to meet him at Garfield High's gymnasium at midnight. When Black Lightning went to meet with Joey Toledo, he was caught by surprise when Joey had brought Malcolm Merlyn the Dark Archer with him to kill Black Lightning. The fight was later crashed by Talia al Ghul and the League of Assassins who were not pleased with Merlyn leaving them after failing to kill Batman. The battle turned into a three-way battle where Joey Toledo was killed by a League of Assassins operative.

In 2016, DC Comics implemented another relaunch of its books called "DC Rebirth", which restored its continuity to a form much as it was prior to "The New 52". Joey Toledo appears as a sleazy small-time entrepreneur who sold a sci-fi gun to Rick Simmons. He was found dead after Tobias Whale's right-hand woman Miss Pequod dealt with some loose ends.

Joey Toledo in other media
Joey Toledo appears in season 1 of Black Lightning, portrayed by Eric Mendenhall. He is a member of the 100 Gang, where he serves as Tobias Whale's right-hand man and co-enforcer alongside Syonide. Joey Toledo is first seen with Syonide in the episode "The Resurrection" when they bring Latavius "Lala" Johnson to Tobias Whale following Black Lightning's re-emergence and his attack on the Seashell Motel that was a front for the 100. In the episode "Black Jesus", Tobias Whale has Joey Toledo murder the morgue doctor who previously told him that Black Lightning died from their last battle. In the episode "And Then the Devil Brought the Plague: The Book of Green Light", Black Lightning and Peter Gambi track the Green Light distribution to Joey Toledo. On a tip from Inspector Henderson, Black Lightning confronts Toledo, but his headaches incapacitate him, allowing Toledo to escape as he vows to Black Lightning that Tobias Whale will kill him. In the episode "Three Sevens: The Book of Thunder", Joey Toledo informs Tobias Whale of his encounter with Black Lightning and states that he has contacted Deputy Chief Zeke Caymen on where to find him. In the episode "Equinox: The Book of Fate", Joey Toledo is seen at Tobias Whale's club. He is killed by a disguised Peter Gambi during his raid to make it look like Lady Eve ordered the hit.

Trajectory

Trajectory is a fictional superheroine in DC Comics.

Originally from Manchester, Alabama, Eliza Harmon was chosen by Lex Luthor to participate in the Everyman Project after she came to him, begging to be granted superspeed. Her wish was granted and she became a member of Luthor's new superhero team. However, she was not able to slow down to normal speed without taking the drug known as the Sharp. She blamed this predicament on Luthor and left the team.

Weeks later, she had stopped using the Sharp and her friend and former teammate, Natasha Irons, convinced Luthor to let her back on the team. She hoped to one day move on to become a member of the Teen Titans and become the new Kid Flash. However, her dream was cut short, as Luthor stripped her of her powers at a crucial moment in a battle with Blockbuster III and she was killed.

Trajectory in other media
 Trajectory appears in a self-titled episode of The Flash, portrayed by Allison Paige. This version is a scientist at Mercury Labs who once helped Caitlin Snow with the Velocity-9 formula, which the latter used to try and restore "Jay Garrick's" lost speed. Even though Snow never gave her the entire formula, Harmon reverse-engineered the drug, but became hooked on it, blaming her addiction on work pressure, and manifesting an "evil" personality to justify her actions to herself. Taking the name Trajectory, she becomes a criminal speedster and causes havoc in Central City. After the Flash defeats her, she takes another dose of Velocity-9 while currently on one and disintegrates while using her powers. Her costume is subsequently recovered, modified, and given to Jesse Quick.
 A teenage incarnation of Trajectory appears in Young Justice, voiced by Zehra Fazal. This version is a member of Lex Luthor's Infinity Inc., which is later reworked into the Infinitors.

Tremor 
Tremor is a name shared by multiple characters in the DC Universe.

David Hsu was a supervillain and enemy of The Fly (Jason Troy), first appearing in The Fly #13 (August 1992).

Tremor II was a supervillain and member of the Superior Five, first appearing in Villains United #4 (October 2005).

Roshanna Chatterji was a superhero and member of The Movement, first appearing in Secret Six (vol. 3) #25 (November 2010). She is asexual.

Tsunami

Tsunami is a superhero in the DC Universe.

The character, created by Roy Thomas and Rick Hoberg, first appeared in All-Star Squadron #33 (May 1984).

Within the context of the stories, Tsunami is a Nisei who grew up in Santa Barbara, California, prior to World War II. Due to the racial prejudice against Japanese-Americans, she suffered in the period leading up to the entry of America into the war and joins the cause of the Imperial Japanese government. Over time, she becomes disillusioned by the dishonorable conduct of those she is working with and eventually changes sides. In stories set in contemporary settings, she has a daughter, Debbie, who she raised with her husband, Neptune Perkins.

Dan Turpin

Turtle

Typhoon

Typhoon, a.k.a. David Drake, is a supervillain in the DC Universe.

The character, created by Gerry Conway and Jim Starlin, first appeared in Flash #294 (February 1981).

David Drake was a research scientist at Concordance Research. Drake teamed with fellow scientist Professor Martin Stein (who was secretly one half of the hero Firestorm) to develop a new bathysphere prototype. Drake designed the housing of the vessel, while Stein developed the small nuclear reactor that was to be the craft's power source.

In September 2011, The New 52 rebooted DC's continuity. During the Forever Evil storyline, Typhoon appears as a member of the Secret Society of Super Villains. The Crime Syndicate sent Typhoon with Black Bison, the Hyena, Multiplex and Plastique to finish Gorilla Grodd's job. They were defeated by the Rogues since one of their targets was at the hospital where Captain Cold's sister was staying.

In the Watchmen sequel Doomsday Clock, Killer Frost mentioned in a TV interview that Typhoon was created by the government. Typhoon is among the villains that attend the underground meeting held by the Riddler that talks about the Superman Theory. He and Moonbow claim that they were not created by the government. When the Penguin suggests that they hand Typhoon and Moonbow over to the government, Typhoon attacks the Penguin until he is shot in the face by the Comedian. The issue's final pages reveal the revised history of Typhoon, including that his powers were created in a "controlled accident" after Drake tested positive for the metagene and he was thereafter enlisted as a government agent, while proving that the Superman Theory was partially true. The Director of the Department of Metahuman Affairs orders that Typhoon's body be retrieved for study.

Powers and abilities of Typhoon
The accident that gave David Drake his abilities made him, in essence, the living eye of a storm. As Typhoon, Drake generates a whirlwind around the lower half of his body that enables him to fly or hover. Typhoon can also project lightning from his fingertips, channeling the energy at times as powerful electric blasts. Typhoon can also generate storms of tremendous strength that generate tornadoes and driving hail. While the storms were originally localized to Drake's vicinity, over time he has gained the ability to generate entire storm systems that can stretch over multiple states. Typhoon can also grow in size relevant to size of the storm system he is generating. At times, he has grown larger than a skyscraper when generating a storm system of sufficient strength. Typhoon can change back and forth between his superhuman form and that of David Drake at will. He has shed his costume and returned to operating in the nude.

References

 DC Comics characters: T, List of